The Hanyu Shuiping Kaoshi (HSK), translated as the Chinese Proficiency Test, is the standardized test of Standard Chinese (a type of Mandarin Chinese) language proficiency of Mainland China for non-native speakers such as foreign students and overseas Chinese. The test is administered by Hanban, an agency of the Ministry of Education of the People's Republic of China.

The test cannot be taken in Taiwan, where only Taiwan's TOCFL exam can be taken. In turn, the TOCFL exam is not available in Mainland China.

Background 
Development of the HSK test began in 1984 at Beijing Language and Culture University, and was officially made a national standardized test in 1992. By 2005, over 120 countries had participated as regular host sites and the tests had been taken around 100 million times (domestic ethnic minority candidates included). In 2011, Beijing International Chinese College became the first HSK testing center to conduct the HSK test online.

The HSK test is analogous to the English TOEFL, and an HSK certificate is valid without any limitation in China. The test aims to be a certificate of language proficiency for higher educational and professional purposes. It is not uncommon to refer to a standard or level of proficiency by the HSK level number, or score. For example, a job description might ask for foreign applicants with "HSK5 or better."

The HSK is administered solely in Mandarin and in simplified Chinese characters; however, if the exam is paper-based, the test-taker can choose to write the writing assignments in simplified or in traditional characters, at their discretion. The test can be either paper-based or Internet-based, depending on what the specific test center offers. With an Internet-based test, the writing part with characters (from HSK 3 on) is subjectively and slightly easier, as one types the pinyin and selects the right character from the list, while with a paper-based test, one must remember the characters, their strokes and their order, and write them out.

Test takers with outstanding results can win a scholarship for short-term language study in China.

Structure

From 2021 
In 2020, an internal Chinese academic paper discussed that the Chinese Proficiency Standards would undergo a change: a hybrid paradigm of "Three Stages and Nine Levels" characterized by all-in-one integration. The Ministry of Education of the People's Republic of China announced further details regarding HSK 3.0 on April 1, 2021. Among the information shared was a wordlist for each individual stage, and a date for the introduction of the new test—July 1, 2021. As of April 2022 no HSK 3.0 tests have been rolled out and only a single preparation book for the basic levels has been published, additionally the HSK 2.0 test format is still in use. An update on the official HSK website suggests, that the April 2021 date only signified the start date for the conception of the new HSK 3.0. New practice materials for the intermediate and advanced levels are expected to be released in the third or fourth quarter of 2022. One of the main problems with the current HSK test is that it does not follow the Common European Framework of Reference for Languages (CETR). For example, HSK 6 was nowhere close to Near Native C2 in English, and so on.

The new test is meant to follow the latest research in the field of language studies and testing. The basic levels (roughly corresponding to CEFR A1/A2) should test from 500 to 2245 words, the intermediate levels (roughly corresponding to CEFR B1/B2) from 3245 to 5456 words, the advanced levels (roughly corresponding to CEFR C1/C2) from about 6000 to 11000 words.

The intermediate levels should test the ability to understand slightly modified authentic materials or authentic materials written/spoken in a clear manner and intended for educated mother tongue speakers: materials concerning everyday topics, simple articles, simple commentaries and critiques found in newspapers and magazines.

The advanced levels should test the ability to understand longer, more complicated and abstract materials: extracts from authentic sources such as textbooks for Chinese university students, Chinese magazine and essays, extracts from modern Chinese literature, interviews and extracts from Chinese media. Moreover, Classical Chinese expressions and grammatical structures used in modern formal Chinese should be included too.

Between 2010–2021 
The previous format was introduced in 2010, with a philosophy of testing "comprehensive language and communication ability". Most notable are the inclusion of written segments at all levels (not just in the Advanced levels as in the pre-2010 test), a reform of the ranking system, and the use of new question structures. Complete vocabulary lists, previous tests, and simulated tests are available as preparation materials. A minor update of the vocabulary lists was made in 2012.

The HSK consists of a written test and an oral test, which are taken separately.

Written test 

The Listening, Reading and Writing tests each have a maximum score of 100. HSK 1 and 2 therefore have a maximum score of 200 with 120 points required to pass. HSK 3 and 4 have a maximum of 300 points with 180 points required to pass. There is no minimum number of points required for each of the sections as long as the sum is over 120 or 180 points respectively.

HSK 5 and 6 also have a maximum of 300 points and originally required a score of 180 points to pass. However, since a decision made in February 2013, there has been no official passing score for either HSK 5 or 6.

Hanban provides examples of the exam for the different levels together with a list of words that need to be known for each level. These examples are also available (together with the audio for the Listening Test) on the websites of the Confucius Institute at QUT and HSK Academy.

Online test 
The written version is now available in two forms, a computer and a paper based test. Both tests are still held at test centers, the differences between the two are as follows:
 Not every test center has the facilities for conducting computer-based tests
 Computer-based tests allow you to input characters using the keyboard
 Results of computer-based tests are published two weeks after the exam, paper-based test results take one month

Oral test 
The HSKK test is a separate test. However, the three HSKK levels correspond with the six HSK levels of the written test.

Comparison with CEFR levels 
In 2010, Hanban asserted that the HSK's six levels corresponded to the six levels of the Common European Framework of Reference for Languages (CEFR). However, the German and French associations of Chinese language teachers reject this equivalency, arguing that HSK Level 6 is only equivalent to CEFR Level B2 or C1.

Before 2010

Ranking 

Formerly, there were 11 possible ranks (1-11) and 3 test formats (Basic, Elementary/Intermediate, and Advanced). A rank of between 3 and 8 was needed to enroll in a Chinese university, depending on the subject being studied. A score of 9 or higher was a common business standard.

A student taking the Basic test (HSK) could attain a rank of 1 through 3 (1-3), or fail to meet requirements and thus not receive a rank. The Elementary/Intermediate test (HSK) covered ranks 3-8 (3-8), with ranks below 3 not considered. Likewise, the Advanced test (HSK) covered ranks 9-11 (9-11), with scores below 9 not considered.

Content 
The previous format for both Basic and Elementary/Intermediate HSK included four sections: listening comprehension, grammar structures, reading comprehension, and written expressions. Aside from the written expressions portion (which requires writing of Chinese characters), these two tests were completely multiple-choice. The Advanced HSK however, added an additional two portions: spoken and written.

Test dates and locations 
The HSK is held at designated test centers in China and abroad. A list of test centers can be found at the HSK website. Test dates are published annually and written tests are more frequently held than spoken ones, generally around once a month, depending on the test center. Test registration is usually open until 30 days prior to the actual test date for the paper-based test or around 10 days prior the actual test date for the computer-based test. Results are generally available around 30 days after completion (but no definite date is given for results).

The test cannot be taken in Taiwan (The Republic of China). In Taiwan, only the TOCFL exam can be taken. Conversely, the TOCFL can not be taken in Mainland China, Macau and Hong Kong.

See also 
 Test of Chinese as a Foreign Language – the Chinese language test used in Taiwan
 ZHC – a Chinese language written test intended for native speakers in China
 Putonghua Proficiency Test – a Chinese language oral test intended for native speakers in China
 CTCSOL - Certificate for Teachers of Chinese to Speakers of Other Languages
 List of language proficiency tests

References

External links 

 Official HSK Website
  News on publishing the word list for the 2021 version of HSK (March 31, 2021)
 2021 HSK word list (plain text file that can be imported into Pleco)
 Comprehensive guide with complete list of characters, words and sounds for all 6 HSK levels
 Official HSK Website at Hanban
 List of Chinese characters needed to be known to pass HSK
 List of HSK words by level on Wiktionary
 Exam Centre: Yale-China Chinese Language Centre, The Chinese University of Hong Kong
 Passing the HSK Exam
 HSK Anti mix-up tool
 The Ultimate HSK Guide including all 5000 vocabularies with Pinyin and translation

Standard Chinese
Chinese language tests
Language tests